Cermak-Chinatown is an 'L' station on the CTA's Red Line. The station is located in Chicago's Chinatown neighborhood and contains many elements of Chinese culture in its architecture.

The resort has two tile murals with "Welcome to Chinatown" also written in Chinese. Passengers using the stairs or escalator are welcomed by a couple of lion statues, called "foo dogs," meant to protect against evil spirits at the entrance. The bins on the platform are painted in red and green, the Chinese color for prosperity and longevity, with Welcome written in Chinese on the next one.

Customers outside the station can also see Chinese character masks of Chinese opera and theater productions on the walls. Cermak–Chinatown is open 24/7 as part of the service on the Red Line. In 2014, an annual total of 1,567,588 passengers boarded this station.

History

Truck collision

On April 25, 2008, a semi truck crashed into the station, killing two and injuring 21, at least seven critically. Part of the station collapsed after the impact. Bystanders said that the driver of the truck was coming off the northbound Dan Ryan Expressway exit. The truck driver was taken into custody and died later in the year.

Renovation
The original station (designed by Skidmore, Owings and Merrill) had undergone updates since its opening in 1969. After the truck collision, however, CTA officials planned to fully rebuild the station house, with construction beginning in fall 2009. On June 4, 2010, a new auxiliary entrance/exit opened at Archer Avenue, to provide convenient access to 62 Archer buses as well as to Chinatown Square and the Richland Center. On April 15, 2011, the main entrance on the north side of Cermak Road reopened and was upgraded with an elevator making it ADA-accessible. The auxiliary entrance on the south side of Cermak Road reopened on April 30, 2011.

Cermak/Chinatown, like all Dan Ryan Branch Red Line stations, closed from May 19, 2013 to October 20, 2013 for the Red Line South Reconstruction Project.

Bus connections
CTA
21 Cermak
24 Wentworth (Weekdays Only)
62 Archer

Notes and references

Notes

References

External links
 
 Cermak-Chinatown Station Page at the CTA website
 Cermak-Chinatown Station Page at Chicago-L.org

CTA Red Line stations
Railway stations in the United States opened in 1969
Armour Square, Chicago